Shi Wen-long or Hsu Wen-lung (born 1928, Tainan Prefecture, Japanese-era Taiwan) is a Taiwanese businessman and the founder of Chi Mei Corporation, the largest maker of ABS resin in the world. He has been ranked among Forbes' World's Richest People.  He was chairman of Chi Mei until his resignation 2004, though he still holds significant stakes in the company and sits on its board.

Shi was a senior advisor to Chen Shui-bian during his presidency and is known to support pro-Taiwan independence causes, a stance which has made him unpopular with mainland China. He has claimed that Taiwanese women who acted as comfort women during Japanese rule were not forced to do so, which created much controversy.

In 1992, Shi founded the Chimei Museum, in which he collects valuable string instruments made by Antonio Stradivari, Guarneri del Gesù and other famous artisans. The museum is known for holding the world's largest collection of violins. Shi is an amateur performing concert violinist.

References

External links
 Hsu's letter a timely lesson for everyone

1928 births
Living people
Taiwanese businesspeople
Taiwanese violinists
Senior Advisors to President Chen Shui-bian
Taiwanese billionaires
Politicians of the Republic of China on Taiwan from Tainan
Taiwanese people of Hoklo descent
21st-century violinists
Winners of the Nikkei Asia Prize